In for Treatment is a 1979 Dutch drama film directed by Marja Kok and Erik van Zuylen. It was created by members of the Dutch theater group  after two theater productions on the same theme of facing the prospect of death following a diagnosis remained in demand after hundreds of performances. The story is based on the experiences of the father of the lead actor Joop Admiraal.

The film was selected as the Dutch entry for the Best Foreign Language Film at the 53rd Academy Awards, but was not accepted as a nominee. It won the Bronze Leopard and Prize of the Ecumenical Jury at the Locarno International Film Festival in 1980.

Cast
  as De Bruin
  as Frank
 Marja Kok as Mrs. De Waal
  as Dr. Hageman
 Daria Mohr as Anja Vonk
  as nurse
 Gerard Thoolen as male nurse
 Herman Vinck as Frank's father
  as Mr. De Waal
 Olga Zuiderhoek as nurse

See also
 List of submissions to the 53rd Academy Awards for Best Foreign Language Film
 List of Dutch submissions for the Academy Award for Best Foreign Language Film

References

External links
 

1979 films
1979 drama films
Dutch drama films
1970s Dutch-language films